Shchyolkovsky District is an administrative and municipal district (raion), one of the thirty-six in Moscow Oblast, Russia. It is located in the northeast of the oblast. Its administrative center is the city of Shchyolkovo. Population: 193,629 (2010 Census);  The population of Shchyolkovo accounts for 57.0% of the district's total population.

References

Notes

Sources

Districts of Moscow Oblast